The Maysville and Lexington Railroad was a 19th-century railway company in north-central Kentucky in the United States, connecting Maysville on the Ohio River with Lexington at the center of the state. It operated from 1850 to 1856, when it failed. It was subsequently reëstablished as two separate companies  a Northern and a Southern division. Both were eventually incorporated into the L&N and today make up part of the CSX Transportation system.

See also
 List of Kentucky railroads

Defunct Kentucky railroads
Defunct companies based in Kentucky
Railway companies established in 1850
Railway companies disestablished in 1856
1850 establishments in Kentucky
1856 disestablishments in Kentucky
American companies disestablished in 1856
American companies established in 1850